The Minister for Trade, Investment and Innovation is a Junior ministerial post in the Scottish Government. As a result, the Minister does not attend the Scottish Cabinet. The post was created in June 2018,and supports the Cabinet Secretary for Finance, Economy and Fair Work who is full member of cabinet.

The Minister for Trade, Investment and Innovation has specific responsibility for: 
Trade and inward investment
Innovation and increasing productivity 
Internationalisation and European Structural Funds 
Financial services
Life sciences
Low Carbon Economy

List of office holders 
The current Minister for Trade, Investment and Innovation is Ivan McKee.

See also
Scottish Parliament

References

External links 
 Minister for Trade, Investment and Innovation on Scottish Government website

Trade, Investment and Innovation
Economy of Scotland
Business in Scotland